"Sexy Zone" is a song by Japanese idol group Sexy Zone. It was released on November 16, 2011, as its debut single under Pony Canyon. The song was written by Satomi and Kōji Makaino.

"Sexy Zone" was released in five editions: Regular Edition, Limited Editions A, B, C, and D. It ranked number one on both the Oricon Singles Chart and Billboard Japan Hot 100, making the quintet the youngest music act to debut atop the former. The single was certified platinum by the Recording Industry Association of Japan (RIAJ), denoting shipments of 250,000 units.

Background
The formation of Sexy Zone was announced during a press conference on September 29, 2011, consisting of Kento Nakajima, Fuma Kikuchi, Shori Sato, So Matsushima, and Marius Yo. With an average age of 14.2 years, Sexy Zone became the youngest group announced by Johnny & Associates. Born in Germany, Yo also became the first non-native singer to debut under the agency.

Release and promotion
Sexy Zone first performed "Sexy Zone" during the Kis-My-Ft2 with Johnny's Jr. show, where they performed in all-white tuxedos and a rose in hand. The quintet imitated promotions for the single by performing it on TV Asahi's Music Station beginning on November 11.

"Sexy Zone" was released on November 16, 2011, in five editions: Regular Edition; Limited Edition A with bonus DVD content that includes the music video for "Sexy Zone"; Limited Edition B with bonus DVD content that includes a "close-up version" of the music video; and Limited Edition C with bonus DVD content that includes off-shots and an interview movie. The track was used for the 2011 FIVB Volleyball Men's World Cup and 2011 FIVB Volleyball Women's World Cup.

Commercial performance
On the issue dated November 16, 2011, "Sexy Zone" debuted at number one on Japan's national weekly Oricon Singles Chart, selling 172,925 copies in its first week. Sexy Zone became the youngest music act to top the chart with an average age of 14.4 years, surpassing the record of 14.6 years previously held by Yuma Nakayama w/B.I.Shadow when its single "Akuma na Koi" / "NYC" ranked number one in 2009. On Billboard Japan Hot 100, the song debuted at number 63 and topped the chart the following week.

"Sexy Zone" was certified platinum in November 2011 by the Recording Industry Association of Japan for shipments exceeding 250,000 units. According to Oricon's year-end report, the single sold 211,908 copies domestically and ranked number 30 on its list of best-selling singles. It also ranked at number 98 on the Billboard Japan Hot 100 Year End chart.

Track listing

Charts

Weekly

Year-end

References

2011 singles
2011 songs
Billboard Japan Hot 100 number-one singles
Japanese-language songs
Oricon Weekly number-one singles
Pony Canyon singles
Sexy Zone songs
Songs written by Kōji Makaino